Rocky Harbour is a town located on the western edge of Newfoundland, near the entrance to Bonne Bay. The harbour was previously known as Small Bay or Little Harbour. This town is home to Gros Morne National Park, a World Heritage Site.

History
Arrowheads show that Mi'kmaw once inhabited the area.  During the eighteenth and nineteenth centuries, the harbour was frequented by the early French fisherman when it came under the French Shore fishery. The first year Rocky Harbour appeared in the census figures was in 1874, when it had a population of 35.

A post office was established there in 1900. It became a Local Government Community in April [[1966]]. Following the opening of Gros Morne National Park in 1973, the population further increased and services such as an RCMP detachment were added. area.  It had a population of 357 in 1921. In 2011, the population was 979.

Rocky Harbour is a key tourist town in central Gros Morne National Park, offering nature and scenery viewing, and access to hiking trails. The town's only school, Gros Morne Academy, is also home to the Rocky Harbour Public Library. Neighbouring communities include Norris Point and Neddie's Harbour. Rocky Harbour has two exits from Newfoundland and Labrador Route 431.

Demographics 

Gallery

See also
List of cities and towns in Newfoundland and Labrador

References

External links

Rocky Harbour - Encyclopedia of Newfoundland and Labrador, vol. 4, p. 616-617.

Populated coastal places in Canada
Towns in Newfoundland and Labrador